This article is the listing of all episodes of Gene Roddenberry's Andromeda. Each season consists of 22 episodes, totaling 110 episodes over five seasons.

The 100th episode (#512, Pride Before the Fall) contains 108 seconds of outtakes (many intentional) at the end as a "thank you" to the viewers.

Series overview

Episodes

Season 1 (2000–2001)

Season one of the series shows Dylan Hunt assembling the crew and adjusting to the new universe, while pursuing the creation of the New Systems Commonwealth.

The idea of the new Commonwealth proves unpopular; only six worlds actually sign the Commonwealth charter in this season. Major powers like the Than Hegemony or the Nietzschean Sabra and Jaguar prides are not really interested in the new Commonwealth; Dylan also manages to make quite a few enemies himself (including the most powerful of all Nietzschean Prides, Drago-Kazov). Dylan also encounters several dysfunctional remnants of the old High Guard and witnesses the consequences of some of his own actions 300 years before. He realizes that the old Commonwealth had made some mistakes, the repetition of which he has to avoid.

The unification of Andromedas crew is a major theme of season one. Dylan's new crew does not really believe in the idea of the Commonwealth, and joins him only for personal gain. To their surprise they find that having something to fight for is not a bad thing. In the season finale, Beka, Dylan's First Officer, even promises to continue his mission if he dies.

Initially Trance seems to be a ditzy naive girl, warm and compassionate but serving little actual purpose on the ship. She quickly demonstrates she is more than she seems. Trance has a strong ability to gauge probabilities in the fabric of space-time, which seems to others as if she could see the future. She describes it as seeing "all possible futures". She uses this ability several times to help her friends, but her true goals remain unknown. The show hints that she engineered the Battle of Witchhead, where the last remains of the old Commonwealth fleet were destroyed, taking most of the Nietzschean forces with them, by "accidentally" sending the Andromeda back in time and pulling various members of the crew by the right strings. Dylan himself has a difficult time accepting the fact that the universe he lived in no longer exists and all his friends are long dead. In a bizarre accident he actually manages to contact his fiancée, Sara Riley, 300 years before and even to teleport onto her ship – but returns alone, deciding the new Commonwealth is more important than his own life.

In the season finale, Andromeda encounters the Magog World ship, a huge structure of twenty connected planets and an artificial sun. The World ship contains trillions of Magog and is equipped with a powerful weapon – a point singularity projector, which creates miniature black holes. Andromeda is heavily damaged; Tyr and Harper are abducted to the World ship. Trying to rescue them, Rev Bem follows them to the World ship. The rest of the crew are badly injured.

Season 2 (2001–2002)

Season two begins with the crew of Andromeda in a seemingly hopeless situation. Dylan and Trance are revived by Beka, and Dylan goes to the Magog World ship with Rommie (the android avatar of Andromedas AI) to recover Tyr, Harper and Rev. Harper is infested with Magog eggs, and Rev's loyalty is strained when he encounters the being the Magog call the Spirit of the Abyss. They believe it to be their creator and god. Although Dylan and Rommie rescue Tyr and Harper, Andromeda is badly damaged, Rev has a spiritual crisis, and there seems to be no possible way to extract the Magog larvae from Harper. A powerful drug will keep them dormant for a time, but it only delays the inevitable.

The season shows the crew reacting to the sudden necessity of the New Commonwealth after the discovery of the World ship (which will arrive at the Known Worlds in a few years), as they continue to make sure the dream comes true. Many worlds became more willing to sign the charter after learning of the World ship. Dylan becomes more ruthless in his actions as well. The episode "Ouroboros" (2:12) in the middle of this season became a major turning point for the whole series. "Ouroboros" was the last episode written solely by Robert Hewitt Wolfe, the show's original developer and head writer, though he returned a few episodes later to finish the writing job on "Dance of the Mayflies". The producers allegedly felt that the series was becoming too intellectual and complicated. One immediately visible change was Trance's transformation, she exchanged places with her own future version; the new Trance had a different (golden-skinned) appearance and a much more serious personality.

Brent Stait (Rev Bem) also left Andromeda in "Ouroboros" due to exhaustion, he clarified in an interview said:

He reprises his role twice later, in seasons three and four. Ethlie Ann Vare, another writer, rounds out the list of people who departed the show this season.

In the second half of season two, the restoration of the Systems Commonwealth becomes a much less significant theme. The show mostly concentrated on Star Trek-style standalone adventures. However, by the end of the season, the new Commonwealth had gained a new powerful war fleet and a total of fifty worlds. This period also saw Kevin Sorbo reunited with his Hercules co-star Michael Hurst for one episode. Andromedas Nietzschean crewman, Tyr Anasazi, is revealed to have a son, Tamerlane Anasazi, who is a genetic reincarnation of Drago Museveni, founder, and progenitor of the entire Nietzschean race. Since all the Nietzschean Prides believe that Museveni's genetic reincarnation will necessarily be a great leader, the Nietzschean Messiah, Tyr Anasazi gets a unique opportunity to unite all the Nietzschean Prides. He does not use it yet, biding his time.

In the season finale, the Systems Commonwealth is finally reinstated. A ceremony is held onboard the Andromeda, but interrupted by the attack of unknown extra-dimensional aliens.

Season 3 (2002–2003)

For season three, Bob Engels was brought on the writing staff to fill the hole in that had been left by the departure of Robert Hewitt Wolfe and Ethlie Ann Vare. This season had the most episodic format of all. The Systems Commonwealth is already reunited, but there is not much progress in the fight with the Magog and the Abyss.

Several episodes of season three explore Trance and her actual role. One episode ("The Dark Backward") is filmed completely from Trance's viewpoint, showing that she indeed "lives" through all possible alternate futures before choosing the right one. Nietzschean crewman Tyr Anasazi makes his move at the end of the season. He implants his son Tamerlane Anasazi's DNA into his own cells, and goes on to reunite the various Nietzschean Prides and separate them from the Systems Commonwealth again. The season ends with Nietzscheans withdrawing from the Commonwealth and Tyr Anasazi formally leaving the Andromeda.

Season 4 (2003–2004)
Season four marked an extreme change in the writing staff. The writing team of Zack Stentz and Ashley Edward Miller, who had been with the show from the beginning and written more episodes of season three than anyone else, did not return for season four. The writing team of Matt Kiene and Joe Reinkemeyer, who had also been with the show from the beginning and who had written almost as many seasons three episodes as Zack and Ash, also did not return for season four, though Kiene did write a single episode on his own. The weight was mostly taken up by new writers: Larry and Paul Barber, who had no previous involvement with the show, wrote the bulk of season four. Other newcomers included Ted Mann, Scott Frost, John Kirk, Lawrence Meyers, and the team of Lu Abbott and Stacey Berman-Woodward, none of whom contributed more than one episode. Naomi Janzen, who had only written a single episode in the show's first three seasons put together, wrote four episodes in this season.

Dylan is nearly outlawed by the Systems Commonwealth he restored. The Collectors (originally keepers of historical information unknown to anyone else), allied with the Spirit of the Abyss, manipulate the fragile government of the New Commonwealth to show him in a bad light. The Abyss infiltrates the Commonwealth using many other agents as well. Eventually, the Collectors unite with Tyr Anasazi and his newly united Nietzschean Prides. Tyr mistrusts the Spirit of the Abyss and hopes to defeat it. He tries to find a map to the Route of Ages, a portal connecting all galaxies together. It is possible to weaken the Abyss by passing through it. Dylan gets the map instead but he allows Tyr to follow Andromeda through the Route of Ages as Tyr knows more about the Abyss. Andromeda is transported into a weird universe where thoughts manifest as reality. With Trance's help, Dylan defeats and kills Tyr who tried to make a deal with the Abyss.

Since the Route of Ages closes before the Andromeda can return, Dylan has to use Trance's help. She reveals that she is the Avatar of the Sun, with "the power to create and destroy". Trance destroys Andromeda and recreates it in the right universe. In this season, Dylan also finds a new crew member — Nietzschean Telemachus Rhade, who does not accept his race's betrayal of the Commonwealth and agrees to join Dylan. Rhade proves to be more manageable than Tyr Anasazi, whom he helped Dylan defeat. The Magog evolve and become more intelligent and cunning. In the season finale, their World ship is rediscovered. It is heading towards the Arkology, an old space station with a pacifist population. Dylan frantically tries to convince them that they have to defend themselves but the people of the Arkology hope to make peace with the Magog.

They pay dearly for that mistake, as the Magog never makes peace with anyone. Andromeda tries to defend the Arkology against the World ship, but is horribly outnumbered. The Arkology is destroyed by all its inhabitants. Rhade, Beka and Harper are left in absolutely hopeless situations. Rommie explodes after being shot through her stomach while saving Harper from the Magog. Trance asks Dylan to escape on a slip fighter through the Route of Ages, claiming that now there is nothing more important than saving his life; Marlowe, Arkology's leader (who had disappeared several hours before the battle) tells Dylan that they both are Paradine, two of the few ancient beings with incredible powers. Dylan reluctantly leaves through the Route (in a strange sequence where he finds himself in a large dark room and seemingly meets another version of himself). Trance turns into a sun and crashes into the World ship on the Andromeda.

Season 5 (2004–2005)
Season five of the series shows Dylan Hunt re-assembling the crew and adjusting the Seefra system and his newly discovered role as a Paradine, finds himself transported into the Seefra system — nine identical barren worlds with a superstitious population and two dim suns. Technology (especially spaceflight) is shunned, and water is treasured because of constant drought. Flavin, a Paradine, meets Dylan here, giving him cryptic hints about Dylan's destiny and what Seefra is before disappearing.

Dylan eventually finds Nietzschean warrior Telemachus Rhade, pilot Beka Valentine and super-genius engineer Seamus Harper on Seefra, and to his amazement, they all arrived in Seefra at different times and locations. Harper, in particular, arrived three years earlier with the remains of the android Rommie. He tried to repair her but failed, eventually building another android, Doyle, with some of Rommie's memories. Initially, he convinces her that she is human, but later her true identity is revealed by a rebel android. The reason for replacing Rommie with Doyle is Lexa Doig's pregnancy. Rommie was rebuilt by Doyle late in this season. Trance is also found, but she is weakened by her attempt to transport Andromeda and its crew to Seefra. She does not quite remember who she is and what she is supposed to do. Trance underwent a metamorphosis yet again; she is still golden-skinned but appears younger, and her personality resembles her first purple incarnation. Andromeda itself is transported to Seefra as well, but it has no power and no way to restore it. Trance partially recharges the ship's generators, but Andromeda still cannot move (apparently it needs 100 percent power) and its AI behavior is erratic.

The first half of the season deals with three main themes: Dylan's conflict with his crew, his attempts to restore Andromedas power and the eventual discovery of the true role of Trance and the Seefra system. Rhade, Beka and Harper are all angry at Dylan for leaving them behind in the Battle of Arkology and for throwing them to Seefra without any way to get back to the Known Worlds. Their loyalty is strained several times, but seems finally reaffirmed after the intervention by Stranger, a Paradine sent by Dylan from an alternate future. Andromedas power is eventually restored with ancient Vedran artifacts, but it is still unable to leave Seefra, it seems to be located in a "pocket universe" and the only way out is the Route of Ages. Although some characters come and leave through it, Dylan cannot use it. Seefra turns out to be Tarn-Vedra, the long-lost capital of the Commonwealth, but the Vedrans themselves left it long ago, disillusioned with humans. Seefra-1 is the original Tarn-Vedra and Seefra-2 to 9 are copies of it. Tarn-Vedra's original sun was somehow replaced by two artificial constructs, Methus-1 and Methus-2, but it's now damaged and emits deadly flares, which are the reason for Seefra's drought.

The Methus Diagram — a blueprint for the Seefra system, recovered with the help of the mysterious DJ Virgil Vox — also reveals the purpose of the eight extra planets. The Vedran sun will return someday, and destroy Seefra-2 through 9 to slow down and take its position. But because of the damage to Methus-2, this mechanism is not working, and the sun threatens to devastate the system completely.

As the second half of the season builds to major revelations and solutions. In the 100th episode of the series, the crew meets up with Peter, who they eventually deduce will become Drago Museveni, the progenitor of the Nietzschean race. He and Beka have a sexual tryst, after which he takes samples of Beka's DNA to mix with his own to create their children, applying bio-engineering and nanobot technology to these offspring to create the Nietzschean race. This makes Beka their Alpha Matriarch, and an instrumental part of the history of the Systems Commonwealth. Peter exits through the Route of Ages to an earlier time, so that the new race will have already existed for 16 generations when the first episode happens. The episode also sees Andromeda restored to full power. Trance remembers her identity when she meets Ione, the avatar of the Tarn-Vedra moon, and also she is the Tarn-Vedra sun. When she realizes this, her sun enters the Seefra system, and Dylan has to find a way to fix Methus-2 and evacuate eight doomed planets to Seefra-1.

Trance's "sisters" (who call themselves "the Nebula"), however, try to persuade her to join them. In their opinion the fate of Dylan, Seefra or the Known Worlds is irrelevant. Trance stubbornly refuses, and the Nebula imprisons her inside Methus-2, replacing her with Bad Trance (all Avatars of the Suns look alike). It takes some time for Dylan to realize the deception and rescue the real Trance. Dylan proceeds with the evacuation of the Seefra planets, although his plans are hindered by General Burma, a religious leader from Seefra-5. Burma is later revealed to be under the control of the Abyss. In a confrontation with Burma and Evil Trance, Dylan and Beka kill Burma, and Trance drives off her evil counterpart. In the series finale, the Vedran sun is back in place and people are safe on Seefra-1. Trance then contacts the Nebula — the Lambent Kith Nebula, the supreme council of the galaxies which includes fifty Avatars. Trance was once the oldest member of the Nebula, but disagreed with their views of organic life as something insignificant and left long ago. Together with Dylan, she appeals to the Nebula and its leader Maura, who plans to destroy the Abyss by expanding the All Forces Nullification Point until it consumes all galaxies. This incidentally will destroy everything alive in existence; only Seefra will survive. Maura refuses to reconsider their plans but allows Dylan and the Andromeda to return to the Known Worlds. When the Andromeda slipstreams to Tarazed, Dylan finds out that only four days have passed since the Battle of Arkology, and the Magog World ship is crippled but still operational. Rhade reunites with his wife (only to return to the Andromeda shortly).

Andromeda visits Earth (where Harper secretly plans to stay), but as soon as the ship arrives in the system, the planet is promptly destroyed by the Abyss. A huge Nietzschean fleet emerges from behind the debris, and Andromeda barely escapes. Dylan begins to suspect Maura's motives and soon realizes she is the avatar of the Abyss and that all of the Nebula were under its control. Maura had destroyed all Paradines (except Dylan). Trance has Dylan take Andromeda back to Seefra and the Abyss destroys Maura for her failure. At Seefra, Evil Trance returns and reveals herself to be the mysterious Virgil Vox, but Dylan can distinguish the real Trance from her counterpart and kills Vox.

After a massive battle with the Nietzscheans of the Drago-Kazov Pride, Dylan checks the Methus Diagram once again and discovers that Trance's sun is capable of destroying the Abyss. Andromeda returns to Seefra through the Route of Ages, followed by the Abyss. Trance manages to pull her sun closer and plunge it into the Abyss burning it and finally destroying it, as Dylan's battle is over. The Route of Ages transforms into a slipstream portal, allowing the Commonwealth fleet to return to Tarn-Vedra.

References

External links

 
 
  Includes detailed episode guide.

List of episodes
Andromeda